Prince Adalbert of Prussia (1884–1948)
Prince Adalbert of Prussia (1811–1873)